Papayuelo refers to one of a few related trees (or their fruit) in the papaya family:
 Mountain papaya (Vasconcellea pubescens)
 Vasconcellea goudotiana